Cody Joe Ponce (born April 25, 1994) is an American professional baseball pitcher for the Hokkaido Nippon-Ham Fighters of Nippon Professional Baseball (NPB). He played for the Pittsburgh Pirates of Major League Baseball (MLB). He played college baseball for the Cal Poly Pomona Broncos. Ponce made his MLB debut in 2020.

Amateur career
Ponce graduated from Damien High School in La Verne, California. He enrolled at California State Polytechnic University, Pomona, to play college baseball for the Cal Poly Pomona Broncos. In 2014, he played collegiate summer baseball with the Brewster Whitecaps of the Cape Cod Baseball League, and was named a league all-star.

Professional career

Milwaukee Brewers
The Milwaukee Brewers selected Ponce in the second round, with the 55th overall selection of the 2015 Major League Baseball (MLB) draft. Ponce signed with the Brewers, receiving a $1,108,000 signing bonus, the full slot value assigned to the pick. He reported to the Helena Brewers of the Rookie-level Pioneer League to make his professional debut. The Brewers then promoted Ponce to the Wisconsin Timber Rattlers of the Class A Midwest League. He posted a combined 2–1 record with a 2.29 ERA over 14 games (nine starts) between both clubs.

Ponce began the 2016 season on the disabled list with the Brevard County Manatees of the Class A-Advanced Florida State League, and made his first appearance for Brevard County in June. He pitched to a 2–8 record with a 5.25 ERA in 17 starts for Brevard County.

In 2017, Ponce played for both the Carolina Mudcats of the Class A-Advanced Carolina League, and the Biloxi Shuckers of the Class AA Southern League, posted a combined 10–9 record with a 3.14 ERA over 25 starts. He spent the 2018 season with Biloxi, going 7–6 with a 4.36 ERA in 29 games (11 starts). In 2019, he returned to Biloxi to begin the season.

Pittsburgh Pirates
On July 29, 2019, the Brewers traded Ponce to the Pittsburgh Pirates in exchange for Jordan Lyles. Ponce split the 2019 season between Biloxi, the Altoona Curve, and the Indianapolis Indians, going a combined 2–6 with a 4.14 ERA in  innings.

After the season, Ponce was selected for the United States national baseball team at the 2019 WBSC Premier 12. In the tournament he was 1–1 with a 2.03 ERA in three starts covering  innings. He was also added to the Pirates 40-man roster.

Ponce made his major league debut on August 2, 2020 against the Chicago Cubs and was the losing pitcher. He had an 0-6 record and a 7.04 ERA in  innings in 15 games for the Pirates in 2021, while spending the rest of the season with Indianapolis. After the 2021 season, on November 29, 2021, the Pirates released Ponce to allow him to play in Japan.

Hokkaido Nippon-Ham Fighters
On December 5, 2021, Ponce signed with the Hokkaido Nippon-Ham Fighters of Nippon Professional Baseball. On August 27, 2022, Ponce pitched a no-hitter against the Fukuoka SoftBank Hawks in Sapporo Dome, making himself the seventh foreign-born player to achieve it after the NPB introduced the 2-league system when it was reorganized from the JBL in the 1950 season.

References

External links

1994 births
Living people
Altoona Curve players
Baseball players from California
Biloxi Shuckers players
Brevard County Manatees players
Brewster Whitecaps players
Cal Poly Pomona Broncos baseball players
Carolina Mudcats players
Helena Brewers players
Indianapolis Indians players
Major League Baseball pitchers
Peoria Javelinas players
Pittsburgh Pirates players
Sportspeople from Pomona, California
United States national baseball team players
Wisconsin Timber Rattlers players
2019 WBSC Premier12 players
Mat-Su Miners players